An acharya is a guide or instructor in religious matters.

Acharya or Aacharya may also refer to:

 Acharya (2022 film), an 2022 Indian Telugu film
 Aacharya (2006 film), a 2006 Indian Tamil film
 Acharya (Jainism), the head of an order of ascetics
 Acharya (moth), a genus of moths of the family Erebidae
 Acharya (surname), including a list of notable people with the name
 Acharya Institute of Technology, an Indian educational institution
 Acharya S (1960–2015), American Christ myth theorist
 T. G. Raghavachari, known by the pseudonym Acharya